André Robichaud (born May 20, 1937) is a Canadian politician. He served in the Legislative Assembly of New Brunswick from 1970 to 1978, as a Liberal member for the constituency of Shippagan-les-Îles.

References

New Brunswick Liberal Association MLAs
Living people
1937 births